Alexandre Alphonse (born 17 June 1982) is a French-born Guadeloupean football manager and former professional footballer who played as a striker. He currently works as an assistant coach in Switzerland with Servette U21.

Club career
He was part of the 2005–06, 2006–07  and 2008–09 Swiss Championship winning team FC Zürich.

He began his professional career in his home country of France in 2002 and the following season he moved to Switzerland, first to play for Etoile Carouge in 2003–04 then between 2004 and 2006 he played for La Chaux-de-Fonds. On 1 October 2005 he signed for FC Zürich.

Alphonse joined Ligue 1 side Stade Brestois 29 on a two-and-half years deal in January 2012.

Honours 
Swiss Super League (3):
 2005–06, 2006–07, 2008–09

References

External links
 

1982 births
Footballers from Val-d'Oise
French people of Guadeloupean descent
Living people
French footballers
Guadeloupean footballers
Association football forwards
Guadeloupe international footballers
Grenoble Foot 38 players
Étoile Carouge FC players
FC La Chaux-de-Fonds players
FC Zürich players
Stade Brestois 29 players
Servette FC players
Ligue 1 players
Ligue 2 players
Swiss Super League players
Swiss Challenge League players
Guadeloupean expatriate footballers
Expatriate footballers in Switzerland
French expatriate sportspeople in Switzerland
2009 CONCACAF Gold Cup players
Black French sportspeople